Andrew Grant McEachran (born 25 July 1947) was a Scottish footballer who played for Dumbarton.

References

1947 births
Scottish footballers
Dumbarton F.C. players
Scottish Football League players
Living people
Association football wingers